"Into the Fire" is a song by British rock band Asking Alexandria. It is the band's first single off of their self-titled fifth studio album, and to feature lead vocalist Danny Worsnop since his departure in 2015. He returned in October 2016, after the departure of former vocalist Denis Stoff. The single was released on 21 September 2017 by the label, Sumerian Records. The song was used in a trailer for the racing game "MX vs. ATV All Out", which was released on 27 March 2018.

Musical style and themes 
Loudwire described the song as having "punchy, downtuned rhythms and forceful drumming" in the background with Worsnop's clean, melodic singings over the top of it. In addition to the traditional rock elements, synthesized electronic "whoa-oh" sound effects play over parts of the song.

Track listing

Personnel 
 Danny Worsnop – lead vocals, additional guitar
 Ben Bruce – lead guitar, backing vocals
 Cameron Liddell – rhythm guitar
 Sam Bettley – bass
 James Cassells – drums

Charts

References 

2017 songs
2017 singles
Asking Alexandria songs
Songs written by Ben Bruce
Songs written by Danny Worsnop
Sumerian Records singles